The Picturegoers (1960) is the first novel by British writer David Lodge.

The novel interweaves scenes at and near a neighborhood movie theatre, using movies as a touchstone for exploring Catholic values in a changing world, where the cinema introduces values and behaviors from the greater society that differ from those of the traditional community.  Various characters are portrayed, representing, to a certain extent, common types of people in a small earlyish twentieth-century British London neighborhood, though the focus is on one lower-middle-class family.

Literature
 « Conservative Radicalism » : Le roman catholique britannique contemporain, by Jean-Michel Ganteau, Voices from British Literature, http://ebc.chez-alice.fr/ebc157.html, pp. 152~154.

1960 British novels
Novels by David Lodge
Novels set in London
1960 debut novels
Catholic novels
MacGibbon & Kee books